This is a list of notable people who have lived in Hampstead Garden Suburb.

Present
Hugh Laurie – actor and musician.
Sir Brian Leveson – Lord Justice of Appeal (Press ethics inquiry)
Claudia Roden - cookbook author 
Jonathan Ross – television and radio presenter.
Harry Styles – pop singer with One Direction.
Robert Winston – British professor, medical doctor, scientist, television presenter.

Past
Edgar Anstey – documentary filmmaker and Oscar winner (lived at 6, Hurst Close) 
Saif al-Islam Gaddafi – second son of late Libyan leader Muammar Gaddafi
Sir Ove Arup – architectural structural engineer and founder of the engineering firm Arup (lived at 28, Willifield Way) Blue Plaque
Dame Henrietta Barnett – social reformer, founder of Toynbee Hall, Whitechapel Art Gallery and creator of Hampstead Garden Suburb (lived at 1, South Square) Blue Plaque
Stanley Black – bandleader and composer (lived at 8, Linell Close)
Warwick Braithwaite – opera conductor (lived at 23, Linden Lea)
Angela Buxton –  tennis player and winner of the 1956 women's doubles title at the French Championships and Wimbledon (lived in a flat above the shops in Market Place and later at 16, Winnington Road)
John Chapman – playwright of several noted farces (lived at 48, Wildwood Road)
Charlie Chester – comedian (lived at 94, Erskine Hill & 5, Vivian Way)
Charles Clarke – Labour Party MP & Home Secretary (lived at 3, Meadway Close)
Eric Coates – composer (lived at 7, Willifield Way) Blue Plaque
Maurice Codner - British portrait painter (lived at 26, Temple Fortune Lane)
Constantine – the last King of Greece
Sir Robin Day – television and radio journalist and interviewer (lived at 84, Oakwood Road)
George Devine – theatre manager, director and actor, founder of the Young Vic Theatre (lived at Lucas Square, 64, Hampstead Way)
Robert Donat – actor (lived at 8, Meadway) Blue Plaque
Clive Dunn – actor
Noel Edmonds – broadcaster (lived in Brookland Hill)
Vanessa Feltz – personality (lived in Winnington Road)
Darrell Figgis – Irish writer, Sinn Féin activist and independent parliamentarian in the Irish Free State
Michael Flanders – actor, singer and lyricist, one half of Flanders and Swann (lived at 1, Brunner Close)
Mark Fleischmann - actor
Martin Furnival Jones – director general of MI5 from 1965 until 1972 (lived at 53, Temple Fortune Hill)
John Gale – theatre producer and artistic director of Chichester Festival Theatre (lived at 57, Northway)
Antony Gormley – sculptor (lived in Wildwood Road)
Charles Hamilton - writer, who created Billy Bunter under the name of Frank Richards
Tony Hancock – comedian and actor (lived at 10, Grey Close) Blue Plaque
Dame Myra Hess – concert pianist (lived at 48, Wildwood Road) Blue Plaque
Gerard Hoffnung – musician, humorist, caricaturist and broadcaster (lived at 5, Thornton Way)
Archbishop Trevor Huddleston – anti-apartheid campaigner (lived at 53, Hampstead Way)
Barry Hugman - sports author and statistician (lived in Denison Close)
Bruce Kent – CND campaigner (lived at 73, Meadway)
William Knightley-Smith - first class cricketer (lived in Ossulton Way)
William Lewis – Daily Telegraph editor (lived in Northway)
Cyril Luckham – actor (lived at 70, Hampstead Way)
James Bolivar Manson - painter, director of the Tate Britain gallery, lived at 98 Hampstead Way
Peter Mandelson – Labour Party MP and cabinet minister (lived at 12, Bigwood Road)
David McCallum – actor (lived at 1, Erskine Hill)
Millicent Martin - actress - and Ronnie Carroll - singer (lived in Ossulton Way)
Lord Longford & Lady Elizabeth Pakenham & Lady Antonia Fraser – historian and biographer; campaigner; author (lived at 10, Linnell Drive)
Heather Mills – charity campaigner and former model (lived in Allingham Court, The Bishops Avenue)
Cecil Parker – actor (lived at 17, Litchfield Way)
Frank Pick – transport administrator (lived at 15, Wildwood Road)
Sir Ralph Richardson – actor (lived at Bedegars Lee, Kenwood Close) Blue Plaque
Paul Robeson – American actor and singer (lived in Wildwood Road)
Paul Scott – novelist, playwright and poet (lived at 61, Brookland Rise & 78, Addison Way)
Vikram Seth – poet and novelist (lived at 133, Willifield Way) with his mother Leila Seth, the first female Chief Justice in India
Will Self – author and journalist (lived at 33, Brim Hill)
Dinah Sheridan – actress
Emanuel Shinwell – Labour Party MP & Secretary of State for War (lived at 33, Erskine Hill)
Alastair Sim – actor (lived at 13, Wildwood Road)
Sir Donald Sinden – actor (lived at 60, Temple Fortune Lane) Blue Plaque
Lord Soper – Methodist minister, socialist, pacifist and President of the League Against Cruel Sports (lived at 6, Willifield Way & 17, Bigwood Road)
Jerry Springer – American television presenter (born & lived at Belvedere Court, Lyttelton Road).
Ringo Starr – drummer for The Beatles and actor (lived in Kenwood Close)
Nigel Stock – actor (lived at 21, Heathgate)
Thomas S. Tait – Modernist architect (lived at Gates House, Wyldes Close) Blue Plaque
Dame Elizabeth Taylor – actress (lived at 8, Wildwood Road) Blue Plaque
Dimitri Tiomkin – film-score composer and four-time Oscar winner (lived in Hampstead Lane)
Sir Raymond Unwin – engineer, architect and town planner, chief planner of Hampstead Garden Suburb (lived at Wyldes, Hampstead Way) Blue Plaque
Anton Walbrook – actor (lived at 36, Holne Chase)
Sir Hugh Walpole – author (lived in Turner Drive and at 19, Thornton Way)
Gwen Watford & Richard Bebb – actress; actor & noted collector of early sound recordings (lived at 22, Temple Fortune Lane)
Evelyn Waugh – author (lived at 145, North End Road)
Fritz Wegner — artist, illustrator
Rachel Weisz – actress (lived at 6, Linnell Close)
Rebecca West – author, journalist, literary critic and travel writer (lived at 5, Chatham Close)
Harold Wilson – Labour Party MP & twice prime minister (lived at 10 & 12, Southway) Blue Plaque.
Sir Donald Wolfit – actor (lived in Hampstead Way)

Freddie Highmore- actor, writer, and producer

References

Hampstead Garden Suburb